Katsuyama may refer to:

 Katsuyama, Fukui,  a city located in Fukui Prefecture, Japan
 Katsuyama, Fukuoka,  a town located in Miyako District, Fukuoka Prefecture, Japan
 Katsuyama, Okayama,  a town located in Maniwa District, Okayama Prefecture, Japan
 Katsuyama, Yamanashi,  a town located in Minamitsuru District, Yamanashi Prefecture, Japan
 Brad Katsuyama (born 1978), financial services executive IEX, the Investors Exchange
 Katsuyama Eiheiji Line, a railway line in Fukui Prefecture
 Katsuyama Station, in Katsuyama, Fukui Prefecture